Drake Log Cabin is a historic log cabin located at Apollo, Armstrong County, Pennsylvania. It was built about 1816, and is a -story, one-room, rectangular log cabin measuring 18 feet by 22 feet. It has a gable roof and interior end stone chimney. The cabin was restored in 1971 and opened to the public by its owner, the Apollo Area Historical Society.

The Drake Log Cabin was listed on the National Register of Historic Places in 1983.

References

External links
Apollo Area Historical Society

Log cabins in the United States
Historic house museums in Pennsylvania
Houses on the National Register of Historic Places in Pennsylvania
Houses completed in 1816
Houses in Armstrong County, Pennsylvania
1816 establishments in Pennsylvania
National Register of Historic Places in Armstrong County, Pennsylvania
Log buildings and structures on the National Register of Historic Places in Pennsylvania